The 1927–28 Eintracht Frankfurt season was the 28th season in the club's football history.

In 1927–28 the club played in the Bezirksliga Main-Hessen, the top tier of German football. It was the club's 1st season in the Bezirksliga Main-Hessen. The league was founded with the clubs of the north-eastern part of the Bezirksliga Rheinhessen-Saar merging with those of the Bezirksliga Main (Main division).

The season ended up with Eintracht winning the Bezirksliga Main-Hessen (Main division). In the South German Championship round finished as runners-up but were eliminated in the round of 16 of the German Championship knockout stage.

Matches

Legend

Friendlies

Bezirksliga Main-Hessen (Main division)

League fixtures and results

League table

Results summary

Results by round

South German championship round

League fixtures and results

League table

Results summary

Results by round

German championship knockout stage

League fixtures and results

Squad

Squad and statistics

|}

Transfers

In:

Out:

See also
 1928 German football championship

Notes

Sources

External links
 Official English Eintracht website 
 German archive site 

1927-28
German football clubs 1927–28 season